Vyjayanthi Movies is an Indian film production company established in 1974 by C. Aswani Dutt. It is one of the biggest film production houses in Telugu cinema. Vyjayanthi Movies is especially known for its big-budget productions with top movie stars and lavish production values. It is credited with producing some of the most iconic films in Telugu cinema. It has subsidiaries, Swapna Cinema and Three Angels Studio run by Aswani Dutt's daughters Swapna Dutt and Priyanka Dutt.

History

Founding 

Aswani Dutt started his film career as an executive producer for a black and white film directed by K. Viswanath. He wanted to produce a film with his favourite actor N. T. Rama Rao (NTR) and approached him. Named by NTR, Vyjayanthi Movies commenced production, under the proprietorship of Aswani Dutt with the successful film, Eduruleni Manishi in 1975. The logo of the production house contains the image of NTR as Lord Sri Krishna, with a Sankha in his hand and Earth behind him.

Films and success 
The production house went on to make films with the top most actors of Telugu cinema like NTR, ANR, Krishna, Sobhan Babu, Krishnam Raju, Chiranjeevi, and Akkineni Nagarjuna. Many of the films produced by Vyjayanthi Movies were directed by K. Bapayya and K. Raghavendra Rao. 

Vyjayanthi Movies produced several Telugu films like Agni Parvatam (1985), Jagadeka Veerudu Athiloka Sundari (1990), Indra (2002) which were very successful at the box-office. Vyjayanthi Movies introduced popular actors like Jr. NTR, Mahesh Babu, Ram Charan, Allu Arjun, and Nara Rohit to the Telugu cinema.

Vyjayanthi Movies had a successful run until it hit a rough patch with Sakthi in 2011. After this, Aswani Dutt took a seven-year hiatus. He produced Mahanati in 2018 which became one of the highest grossing films of the year.

Subsidiaries

Swapna Cinema 
In 2014, Ashwani Dutt's elder daughter, Swapna Dutt, inherited Swapna Cinema from her father. Under this banner, Swapna and her sister, Priyanka Dutt produced Yevade Subramanyam. This was a big success story at the box office in 2015. In 2018, this banner produced a biopic on the late actress, Savitri. The biopic, titled Mahanati stars Keerthi Suresh, Dulquer Salmaan, Samantha Ruth Prabhu, and Vijay Devarakonda. It was critically acclaimed and highly successful at the box office.

Three Angels Studio 
Aswani Dutt's younger daughter, Priyanka Dutt launched a new production house named Three Angels Studio in 2008. She produced her first film, Baanam (2009), through this company and introduced Nara Rohit to Telugu Cinema. The film was critically acclaimed, but did not do well at the box office. She then produced the anthology film Om Shanti in 2010. It stars Nikhil Siddharth, Kajal Aggarwal, Bindu Madhavi and Navdeep.

Shelved Projects 
After the success of Jagadeka Veerudu Athiloka Sundari (1990), Aswani Dutt wanted to do fantasy film highlighting the CGI. So a film titled Bhooloka Veerudu was started in the direction of Singeetam Srinivasa Rao with Chiranjeevi in the lead role. After completing two schedules, the project was shelved as they realized that they didn't have a proper story in hand and hence shelved the film.

Ram Gopal Varma narrated a story to Aswani Dutt which he liked. Varma was making Daud at that time and felt that the shooting of Daud might be stalled due to Sanjay Dutt's legal issues. So Varma narrated the story to Aswani Dutt and Chiranjeevi which they liked. Aswani Dutt started the project with Chiranjeevi as the lead in the direction of Ram Gopal Varma. After Sanjay Dutt's release, the shooting of Daud resumed. Then Aswani Dutt realized that the storylines for these two films are similar. As he was not comfortable in doing a film which had the same storyline to another film, he stalled the project.

Film production
Vyjayanti Movies

Swapna Cinema

Three Angels Studio

Raghavendra Movie Corporation, Siri Media Arts, and United Producers (Aswani Dutt, Allu Aravind, and K. Raghavendra Rao)

Sri Priyanka Pictures

Roja Art Productions

References

External links
 
 
 

Film production companies based in Hyderabad, India
Film production companies of India
Mass media companies established in 1974
Indian companies established in 1974
1974 establishments in Andhra Pradesh